Bernard Phillip "Bernie" Leahy (August 15, 1908 – March 12, 1978) was an American football halfback who played one season with the Chicago Bears of the National Football League. He attended St. Mel High School (Chicago, Illinois) and played college football at the University of Notre Dame (South Bend, Indiana), both Roman Catholic schools.

References

External links
Just Sports Stats

1908 births
1978 deaths
Players of American football from Chicago
American football halfbacks
Notre Dame Fighting Irish football players
Chicago Bears players